Hranush Hrant Hakobyan is an Armenian politician who is the longest-serving woman in the National Assembly of Armenia and among the only seven women members of Armenia's Parliament. She was the first Armenian woman to be "directly elected" into office by the Armenian people instead of "being appointed by a political party".

She became the long-standing Minister of the Diaspora for many years, before the said ministry was abolished. In 2005, she sponsored Armenia's "gender-quota law" in order to encourage the participation and election of more women in the politics of Armenia.

Biography

Hranush Hakobyan (a mathematician, lawyer, political scientist, non-partisan) was born on 12 April 1954 in the village of Sarukhan in Kamo Region.
 
In 1975, she graduated from the YSU Applied Mathematics Department, later in 1989, from Moscow Academy of Political Sciences.
In 1994, Hranush Hakobyan graduated from the YSU Law Department. She is a Doctor-Professor of Law, Associate Professor, Professor at the State University of Gavar. 
In 1986, she was awarded with the order of “People’s Friendship”.
In the period of 1975-1983, she was a professor at Yerevan State University. 
In 1978-1983, Hranush Hakobyan was appointed Deputy Secretary, Secretary at the Komsomol Committee of Yerevan State University.
In 1983-1990, she became Secretary, First Secretary of the Komsomol of Armenia, a member of Komsomol Central Committee Bureau. 
Hranush Hakobyan once occupied the following positions: Deputy of the Supreme Council of the Arm SSR, a member of the Presidium of the Supreme Council (1986-1990), Deputy at the Supreme Council, Deputy Chairwoman of the Standing Committee of the Supreme Council on Social and Healthcare Affairs (1990-1995), Member of the National Assembly, Head of the Standing Committee on Social, Healthcare and Environmental Affairs at the National Assembly (1995-1996). 
She was a member of the grouping “Republic”, Deputy Chairwoman of the CIS Inter-parliamentary Assembly  Social Affairs Commission (1995-1996). 
In 1996-1998, Hranush Hakobyan was appointed the RA Minister of Social Security. 
She has been a member of Inter-parliamentary Union since 1996, a member of the Women's Affairs Coordinating Council and the Head of the Armenian Delegation since 2003.
In the years 1999-2003, she was a Member of the National Assembly, and also a member of the National Assembly Standing Committee on Foreign Affairs. 
In 2001, she became Secretary of Parliamentary Group called People's Deputy.
On 25 May 2003 she was elected a Member of the National Assembly, Head of the National Assembly Standing Committee on Science, Education, Culture and Youth Affairs. Hranush Hakobyan is a member of the Republican Party of Armenia. 
She also occupied the post of the Chair of the Armenian Women's International Association, co-chair of the Association of Women’s Health, Trustee of Yerevan, Cambridge-Yerevan, Armenia's Orphanages Fund, Co-chair of the Board of trustees of US-Armenia Health Care Center. 
She is the author of 2 books and 25 research papers.

See also
Mariam Vardanian

References

1954 births
Living people
Members of the National Assembly (Armenia)
Government ministers of Armenia
Labor and Social Affairs ministers of Armenia
Women government ministers of Armenia
Yerevan State University alumni
Academic staff of Yerevan State University
20th-century Armenian women politicians
20th-century Armenian politicians
21st-century Armenian women politicians
21st-century Armenian politicians
Diaspora ministers of Armenia
People from Gegharkunik Province